The Stone Gods is a 2007 novel by Jeanette Winterson. It is a post apocalyptic, postmodern, dystopic love story concerned with themes of corporate government control, the harshness of war, artificial intelligence and technology. The novel is self-referential as characters make intertextual references, and cyclical as certain characters’ story arcs repeat. Particularly those of a Robo sapien AI named Spike and her reluctant human companion, Billie. The novel aims mainly to warn against history’s tendency to repeat itself, as well as humanity’s inability to learn from past mistakes. 

Ursula Le Guin, while criticizing exposition and sentimentality, thought the novel a worthwhile and cautionary tale.

Andrew Milner, a literary critic and author of Science Fiction and Climate Change, notes that this book is an early example of 'doomer' climate fiction.

A novel in four parts
 "Planet Blue" – set in a futuristic past, where humanity's destruction of its own homeworld, Orbus, seems to be fixed when they come across and terraform another viable planet.
 "Easter Island" – set in the 18th century, a time when Easter Island's inhabitants destroyed many of the moai statues (and the last tree) on their island.
 "Post-3War" – set in "Tech City" after World War III, with Billie educating Spike, the Robo sapiens.
 "Wreck City" – set in the same setting, although moved to a derelict trash city where those abandoned by the corporate-controlled society struggle to live.

References

2007 British novels
Post-apocalyptic novels
Postmodern novels
Self-reflexive novels
Hamish Hamilton books
Novels by Jeanette Winterson
Environmental fiction books
Novels about robots
Novels about multiple time paths
Novels about genetic engineering
Space colonization literature
Climate change novels